Annai Airport  is an airport serving the village of Annai, in the Upper Takutu-Upper Essequibo Region of Guyana. The runway has  of asphalt paving, with the remainder grass.

It is a small, hinterland airport that serves Guyana's tourism sector.

Since 2019, Annai utilizes the Automatic Dependent Surveillance Broadcast System (ADSB) for tracking planes.

See also

 List of airports in Guyana
 Transport in Guyana

References

Airports in Guyana